Kuat (pronounced "kwatch") is a brand of guarana beverage sold by The Coca-Cola Company in Brazil. Kuat was introduced in Brazil in 1997 to compete with the leading guarana beverage, Guaraná Antarctica, which was stealing market share from Coca-Cola's cola products.

In Brazil, Kuat is available in a diet version (Kuat Zero) and a green-tea infused version (Kuat Eko).

Kuat was briefly sold in Norway starting in 2003 under the name SanSão.

In 2002, Coca-Cola announced plans to test market Kuat in the United States.

See also 

 Guaraná Antarctica
 Sanduíche-iche – a meme used in a Kuat advertizing campaign

References

External links
 
 Kuat published by Coca-Cola Brasil

Coca-Cola brands
Brazilian brands
Guarana sodas
Products introduced in 2006